Donald Wayne Riegle Jr. (born February 4, 1938) is an American politician, author, and businessman from Michigan. He served for five terms as a Representative and for three terms as a Senator in the U.S. Congress.

Early life and family
Donald Wayne Riegle Jr. was born on February 4, 1938, to Donald Wayne Riegle Sr., son of John Louis Riegle, owner of the Riegle Press and future mayor of Flint, MI and Dorothy Grace Riegle in Flint, Michigan. Riegle is a graduate of Flint Central High School. 

He attended Flint Junior College (now Mott Community College) and Western Michigan University, graduated with a B.A in business administration and economics from the University of Michigan-Flint in 1960, and received an M.B.A. in finance from Michigan State University in 1961. Riegle was employed by IBM as a financial analyst from 1961 to 1964. He completed required course work for doctoral studies in business and government relations at Harvard Business School, 1964 to 1966 before he left to run for Congress. Riegle taught at Michigan State University, Boston University, the University of Southern California, and Harvard University.

Political life
In 1966, Richard Nixon persuaded Riegle to return to Michigan to run for Congress.
Riegle was then 28 years old and considered to be a moderate Republican. Nixon attended an early campaign fundraiser, and talked up Riegle's prospects to reporters. 

Riegle defeated incumbent Democratic U.S. Representative John C. Mackie, to be elected from Michigan's 7th congressional district to the 90th Congress. Mackie was one of the Michigan Five Fluke Freshmen who lost their seats after a single term. Riegle was subsequently re-elected as a Republican in the next three elections. 

In 1973, Riegle changed party affiliation to become a Democrat over differences with the Nixon-Agnew Administration regarding the Vietnam War and the "Southern strategy". He was re-elected as a Democrat to the 94th Congress. He did not run for reelection to the House in 1976, but announced his candidacy for the U.S. Senate to succeed retiring Senator Philip Hart and defeated Michigan Secretary of State Richard H. Austin and fellow Congressman James G. O'Hara in the Democratic primary.  He defeated Republican Congressman Marvin L. Esch in the general election.

On December 30, 1976, before the new term began, Riegle resigned from the House and was appointed by the Governor to fill the vacancy caused by the death of Senator Hart for the term ending January 3, 1977. He was reelected to the Senate in 1982 and again in 1988, this time with the largest Democratic vote in the history of the state. Riegle did not seek re-election in 1994.

He served as chairman of the Senate Committee on Banking, Housing, and Urban Affairs, 1989–1995. Riegle also served on the Senate Committee on Finance, where he served as Chairman of the Subcommittee on Health for Families and the Uninsured, the Senate Committee on Labor and Human Resources, where he served as Chairman of the Subcommittee on Alcoholism and Drug Abuse, the Senate Committee on Commerce, Science and Transportation, where he served as the Chairman of the Subcommittee on Science and Space, and was a member of the Senate Committee on Budget from 1979 to 1994.

In his first action as Chairman of the Senate Banking Committee, Riegle led the efforts to reform the savings and loan industry, which resulted in the Financial Institutions Recovery, Reform, and Enforcement Act of 1989 ("FIRREA"). The toughest financial reform bill in 50 years, FIRREA ended the abuses and reformed the savings and loan industry.  FIRREA put controls on state-chartered thrifts, stopped excessive risk taking by savings and loans, limited brokered deposits, banned junk bond investments, and set new capital requirements for savings and loans.

Banking Committee chairman
Riegle also led the efforts to enact the "Thrift and Bank Fraud Prosecution Act of 1990" which was added as an amendment to the Omnibus Crime Bill of 1990.  Under this legislation, the maximum penalty for thrift and bank fraud was increased, including mandatory minimum jail sentences and authorized life imprisonment, provided the funds needed for prosecution in 1991, 1992, and 1993, established a new Financial Institutions Fraud Unit at the Justice Department, directed the Attorney General to establish savings and loan fraud task forces in key cities, allowed the freezing and seizure of assets of suspected savings and loan criminals, and provided for a national commission to examine the causes of the savings and loan crisis and recommend changes to prevent future problems.

In the area of banking reform, Chairman Riegle led the efforts to enact the "Federal Deposit Insurance Corporation Improvement Act of 1991 ("FDICIA"), which preserved the ability of the FDIC to protect depositors and reformed the way banks are run and regulated.  FDICIA also restricted the "too big to fail policy", strengthened regulation of foreign banks in the U.S., and improved disclosure requirements for banks to consumers.

Chairman Riegle also led the effort to create a system of community development banks.  The "Riegle Community Development and Regulatory Improvement Act of 1994" established the Community Development financial institutions Fund to seed and support financial institutions dedicated to supporting community development.  The legislation also provided increased consumer protections for high rate home equity loans, contained measures to increase credit availability to small businesses, streamline the regulation of depository institutions, and reform the National Flood Insurance Program.

The "Riegle-Neal Interstate Banking and Branching Efficiency Act of 1994" eliminated restrictions on interstate banking by permitting bank holding companies to acquire banks in any state, permitted banks to merge across state lines unless states opt-out, and reduced the competitive advantages that foreign banks had in the U.S. market over U.S. banks.

In 1994, Riegle led an investigation of the illnesses being experienced by veterans of the Gulf War, using the jurisdiction of the Senate Banking Committee over "dual use" exports—materials and technology that could be converted to military use.  The resulting investigative report to the Senate detailed at least three occasions on which U. S. military forces came into contact with chemical warfare agents that may have led to the development of Gulf War syndrome and that at least some of those biological agents (weapons of mass destruction) had been provided to Saddam Hussein by the US. Commonly referred to as the Riegle Report to the U.S. Senate, the report called for further government investigation and recourse for war veterans suffering from Gulf War syndrome.

Keating Five
Riegle was among the five senators included in the Keating Five, a banking and political contribution ethics investigation during the 1980s which grew out of the U.S. Savings and Loan Crisis. The Senate investigation involved Charles Keating and Lincoln Savings/Continental Homes, the owner of the Pontchatrain Hotel in Detroit, MI. The Senate Ethics Committee looked into the actions of the senators in relation to their actions connected with Charles Keating and concluded that Senators DeConcini, McCain, Glenn and Riegle "broke no laws or Senate ethics rules, but were aggressive in their actions on behalf of Charles Keating."

Later life
In 1995, he joined Weber Shandwick Public Affairs, in Washington, D.C. There, he was instrumental in building the company's government affairs practice and played an important part in the procurement of Powell Tate, a government affairs firm that is now owned by Weber Shandwick and still operating in Washington D.C., under its independent brand. As the company grew, he took on more responsibility and eventually served as deputy chairman. He joined public relations firm APCO Worldwide in 2001, as chairman of government relations in Washington, D.C.

In 1972, he authored a best-selling book, "O Congress," with Trevor Armbrister, Doubleday & Co., Inc. The book provides an inside look at the workings of Congress, Riegle's opposition to the Vietnam War, and his break with the Nixon White House.

On March 6, 2016, Riegle endorsed Bernie Sanders for the Democratic nomination for President of the United States and then again four years later.

See also
 List of American politicians who switched parties in office
 List of United States representatives who switched parties

References

External links

The Political Graveyard

|-

|-

|-

|-

|-

1938 births
Living people
Methodists from Michigan
Boston University faculty
Democratic Party United States senators from Michigan
Flint Central High School alumni
Harvard Business School alumni
Harvard University faculty
IBM employees
Democratic Party members of the United States House of Representatives from Michigan
Michigan State University alumni
Republican Party members of the United States House of Representatives from Michigan
University of Michigan–Flint alumni
20th-century American politicians
Members of Congress who became lobbyists